The  is a canal in Kyoto, Japan. It rises from Nijō-Kiyamachi, going along Kiyamachi Street, and meets the Uji River at Fushimi port. The canal crosses with the Kamo River on the way. Today the south half is not connected with Kamo River.

History
It was dug by Suminokura Ryōi in 1611, during the Edo period, to transport various goods and resources in the center of Kyoto. It made a great contribution to the development of the city and economic growth at that time.

External links
 (Takasegawa Ichino-Funairi, 高瀬川一之船入, Japanese national memorial, 1st port near Nijō-Kiyamachi)
 (Takase River flows into Kamo River)
 (Shin-Takase River flows into Uji River)

Rivers of Kyoto Prefecture
Geography of Kyoto
Canals in Japan
Canals opened in 1611
Rivers of Japan